The  took place in 1600, concurrent with the battle of Sekigahara. Kyōgoku Takatsugu held Ōtsu castle for the Tokugawa, and commanded the garrison.

Mōri Terumoto and Tachibana Muneshige laid siege. The sides negotiated and Takatsugu surrendered. However, in the meantime Tokugawa Ieyasu had won the battle of Sekigahara, assuring his control of all Japan, and so the loss of Ōtsu was ultimately insignificant.

Some records of the time indicate that the local inhabitants brought picnic boxes and gathered at Mii-dera on Mount Hiei to observe the battle.

References
Turnbull, Stephen (1998). 'The Samurai Sourcebook'. London: Cassell & Co.

1600 in Japan
Otsu 1600
Otsu 1600
Conflicts in 1600